Afzalgarh is a city and a municipal board in Bijnor district in the Indian state of Uttar Pradesh. It is located at the border with the state of Uttarakhand.

Geography
It has an average elevation of 212 metres (695 feet). The nearby cities are Kalagarh, Sherkot, Dhampur, Jaspur and Kashipur.

History
Historically a town of British India, it was founded in the mid-eighteenth century by a local leader named Nawab Afzal Ali Khan, who also built a fort in the area, which was dismantled after the Indian Rebellion of 1857. In 1901, Afzalgarh had a population of 6,474.

Demographics
 India census, Afzalgarh had a population of 24,954. Males constitute 53% of the population and females 47%. According to 2011 India census, Afzalgarh has a population of 2,35,628. Male constituted 52.09% of the population and females 47.91%. Afzalgarh has an average literacy rate of 49%, lower than the national average of 59.5%; with 59% of the males and 41% of females literate. 17% of the population is under 6 years of age.

References

Cities and towns in Bijnor district